Robert McDaid (born 1993) is an Irish Gaelic footballer who plays for Dublin SFC club Ballyboden St Enda's and at inter-county level with the Dublin senior football team. He usually lines out as a defender.

Career

McDaid played Gaelic football at juvenile and underage levels with the Ballyboden St Enda's club. He eventually progressed onto the club's senior team and was selected at right wing-back when Ballyboden beat Castlebar Mitchels in the 2016 All-Ireland club final. McDaid first appeared on the inter-county scene as captain of the Dublin minor football team that lost the 2011 All-Ireland minor final to Tipperary. He later won an All-Ireland U21 Championship title in 2014. McDaid was drafted onto the Dublin senior football team in 2015, however, he remained a member of the extended panel for a number of seasons. He won two All-Ireland Championship titles as a non-playing substitute in 2016 and 2019, before claiming his first winners' medal on the field of play in 2020. McDaid has also won five Leinster Championships and two National League titles.

Honours

University College Dublin
Sigerson Cup: 2016

Ballyboden St. Enda's
All-Ireland Senior Club Football Championship: 2016
Leinster Senior Club Football Championship: 2016, 2019
Dublin Senior Football Championship: 2015, 2019

Dublin
All-Ireland Senior Football Championship: 2015, 2016, 2020
Leinster Senior Football Championship: 2015, 2016, 2020, 2021
National Football League: 2015, 2021
All-Ireland Under-21 Football Championship: 2014
Leinster Under-21 Football Championship: 2014
Leinster Minor Football Championship: 2011 (c)

References

External link
Robbie McDaid profile at the Dublin GAA website

1993 births
Living people
UCD Gaelic footballers
Ballyboden St Enda's Gaelic footballers
Dublin inter-county Gaelic footballers